Novgorodskaya is a rural locality (a village) in Timoshinsky Selsoviet of Verkhnetoyemsky District of Arkhangelsk Oblast, Russia.

References

Rural localities in Verkhnetoyemsky District